Dosse may refer to:
 Dosse (Rigi), a mountain of the Rigi massif in Switzerland
 Dosse (river), a tributary of the Havel in Germany

People with the surname
 François Dosse, French historian and philosopher who specializes in intellectual history
 Marylène Dosse, French-born American classical pianist
 Philip Dosse, British publisher